Once Upon a Time in the Midlands is a 2002 British romantic comedy film directed by Shane Meadows, and co-written with Paul Fraser. The film stars Robert Carlyle, Rhys Ifans, Kathy Burke, Ricky Tomlinson, Shirley Henderson and Andrew Shim. It is set in Nottingham, in the East Midlands region of England.

Plot
Set in Nottinghamshire, Dek (Rhys Ifans) proposes to his girlfriend Shirley (Shirley Henderson) on TV.  When Jimmy (Robert Carlyle), "the great love of her life" and father of her daughter Marlene (Finn Atkins), sees this, he returns in an attempt to win back her heart. However, after deserting his friends in Scotland during an unsuccessful robbery of some clowns, his friends turn against him and come to the Midlands to try to track him down. In the end, Shirley refuses to go with Jimmy and professes her love for Dek; likewise, Marlene refuses to have anything to do with Jimmy, and accepts Dek as her father figure.

Cast
 Robert Carlyle as Jimmy, Carol's foster brother, Shirley's ex-husband and Marlene's father
 Vanessa Feltz as herself
 Ricky Tomlinson as Charlie, Carol's estranged husband
 Kathy Burke as Carol, Jimmy's foster sister
 Vicki Patterson as Audience Guest
 Shirley Henderson as Shirley, Jimmy's ex-wife and Marlene's mother
 Finn Atkins as Marlene, Jimmy and Shirley's daughter
 Kelly Thresher as Donna, Carol's daughter 
 Rhys Ifans as Dek, Shirley's boyfriend
 Andrew Shim as Donut, Donna's boyfriend
 Ryan Bruce	as Emerson, Carol and Charlie's son and Lake and Donna's brother
 Eliot Otis Brown Walters as Lake, Carol and Charlie's son and Emerson and Donna's brother
 Anthony Strachan as Jumbo (credited as Antony Strachan)
 David McKay as Dougy (credited as David Mckay)
 James Cosmo as Billy

Production
This was the third time that Carlyle had worked with Henderson (first in Hamish Macbeth and the second in Trainspotting), the second time he had worked with Ifans (the first in The 51st State), and the fourth time he had worked with Tomlinson (first in Riff-Raff, second in Cracker and third in The 51st State).

Awards
Gijón International Film Festival 2002
Nominated: Best Feature (Grand Prix Asturias) – Shane Meadows

External links

Once Upon a Time in the Midlands. Guardian film of the week.

2002 films
2002 romantic comedy films
British romantic comedy films
Films about dysfunctional families
Films directed by Shane Meadows
Films set in Nottingham
2000s English-language films
2000s British films